MV Lloyd-Jones was a steel ferry that operated on Okanagan Lake in British Columbia, Canada. However, they struggled to carry the load, especially after the opening of the Okanagan Lake Bridge in 1958. Lloyd-Jones was launched in July 1950. She had a capacity of 35 cars and was the last of a large fleet of ferries on Okanagan Lake.

See also

References

History of British Columbia
Culture of Kelowna
West Kelowna
Steamboats of Okanagan Lake